Michael Monroe Anello (born August 16, 1943) is a senior United States district judge of the United States District Court for the Southern District of California.

Early life and education
Born in Miami, Florida, Anello received a Bachelor of Arts degree from Bowdoin College in 1965 and a Juris Doctor from Georgetown University Law Center in 1968.

Career
Anello was on active duty in the United States Marine Corps from 1968 to 1972, and in the United States Marine Corps Reserve from 1973 to 1990. He was a Deputy city attorney of San Diego City Attorney's Office, California from 1972 to 1973. He was in private practice in San Diego from 1973 to 1998.

Judicial service
Anello was a judge on the San Diego Superior Court from 1998 to 2008.

On April 30, 2008, Anello was nominated by President George W. Bush to a seat on the United States District Court for the Southern District of California vacated by Napoleon A. Jones Jr. Anello was confirmed by the United States Senate on September 26, 2008, and received his commission on October 10, 2008. He assumed senior status on October 31, 2018.

References

Sources

1943 births
Living people
Bowdoin College alumni
California state court judges
Georgetown University Law Center alumni
Judges of the United States District Court for the Southern District of California
Superior court judges in the United States
United States district court judges appointed by George W. Bush
21st-century American judges
United States Marines
Lawyers from Miami
Military personnel from Florida